Monodelphis is a genus of marsupials in the family Didelphidae, commonly referred to as short-tailed opossums. They are found throughout South America. , the most recently described species is M. vossi.

Species 

 Sepia short-tailed opossum (Monodelphis adusta)
 Northern three-striped opossum (Monodelphis americana)
 Arlindo's short-tailed opossum (Monodelphis arlindoi)
 Northern red-sided opossum (Monodelphis brevicaudata)
 Yellow-sided opossum (Monodelphis dimidiata)
 Gray short-tailed opossum (Monodelphis domestica)
 Emilia's short-tailed opossum (Monodelphis emiliae)
 Gardner's short-tailed opossum (Monodelphis gardneri)
 Amazonian red-sided opossum (Monodelphis glirina)
 Ihering's three-striped opossum (Monodelphis iheringi)
 Pygmy short-tailed opossum (Monodelphis kunsi)
 Marajó short-tailed opossum (Monodelphis maraxina)
 Osgood's short-tailed opossum (Monodelphis osgoodi)
 Hooded red-sided opossum (Monodelphis palliolata)
 Peruvian short-tailed opossum (Monodelphis peruviana)
 Long-nosed short-tailed opossum (Monodelphis pinocchio)
 Reig's opossum (Monodelphis reigi)
 Ronald's opossum (Monodelphis ronaldi)
 Chestnut-striped opossum (Monodelphis rubida)
 Saci short-tailed opossum (Monodelphis saci)
 Santa Rosa short-tailed opossum (Monodelphis sanctaerosae)
 Long-nosed short-tailed opossum (Monodelphis scalops)
 Southern red-sided opossum (Monodelphis sorex)
 Touan short-tailed opossum (Monodelphis touan)
 Southern three-striped opossum (Monodelphis theresa)
 Red three-striped opossum (Monodelphis umbristriata)
 One-striped opossum (Monodelphis unistriata)
 Voss's short-tailed opossum (Monodelphis vossi)

Speciation is based on fur coloration with additional details coming from differences in the skull and teeth.

Chemosensory communication 
Short-tailed opossums have been found to use nuzzling in chemosensory and exploratory behavior for recognizing individuals of the same species. In Monodelphis domestica, nuzzling and snout-rubbing transforms odor from dry components like glandular secretions, feces, and urine, into moist naso-oral secretions that reach the vomeronasal organ to be processed chemically. Typically, this behavior is used to recognize individual familiar or new scents from the same species, with males typically being drawn to more novel scents from the same species.

Conservation status 
M. sorex and M. rubida are considered to be endangered.

Reproductive development
The genus Monodelphis is marsupial; they are born under-developed and then mature further in the mother's pouch. In Monodelphis, the young first come off the teat in 12 days, whereas this occurs at 48 days in the related genus Didelphis. Most of the events in this process occur about 2–4 weeks later in Didelphis than in Monodelphis. This may be related to the shorter longevity of the species of Monodelphis compared to other marsupials who nurse for a longer period. M. dimidiata is unusual in that it is a semelparous species, something rarely seen in mammals, being found predominantly in smaller didelphids and dasyurids.

References

Further reading

Know Your Short-tailed Opossum: Monodelphis
Integrated Taxonomic Information System

External links

Opossums
.
Taxa named by Gilbert Thomas Burnett